WZOB (1250 AM, "Number One Country 1250") is a radio station licensed to serve Fort Payne, Alabama.  The station is owned by Central Broadcasting Company, Inc.  It airs a country music format.

Originally owned by Glenn M. Gravitt, the station opened July 2, 1950. The call letters, WZOB, came from Zella Octavia Buttram, the daughter of Johnny Buttram (an advisor to Gravitt and brother of Pat Buttram, the well-known radio and TV comedian), and were requested from and assigned by the Federal Communications Commission.

The Louvin Brothers album Songs That Tell A Story is drawn from songs recorded live on a morning WZOB show in the 1950s.

References

External links
 

ZOB
Country radio stations in the United States
Radio stations established in 1950
1950 establishments in Alabama